HMCS Gaspé (hull number MCB 143) was a  that was constructed for the Royal Canadian Navy during the Cold War. The vessel entered service in 1953 and remained with the Royal Canadian Navy until 1958. That year, the ship was transferred to the Turkish Navy and renamed Trabzon. The vessel remained in service until 1991.

Design and description
The Bay class were designed and ordered as replacements for the Second World War-era minesweepers that the Royal Canadian Navy operated at the time.

They had a complement of 38 officers and ratings.

The Bay-class minesweepers were powered by two GM 12-cylinder diesel engines driving two shafts creating . The ships were armed with one 40 mm Bofors gun and were equipped with minesweeping gear.

Operational history
The ship's keel was laid down on 21 March 1951 by Davie Shipbuilding at their yard in Lauzon, Quebec. Named for a bay located in Quebec, Gaspé was launched on 12 November 1951. The ship was commissioned on 26 November 1953. The First Canadian Minesweeping Squadron was constituted in December 1953 with Gaspé an initial unit. The squadron sailed to the Caribbean Sea in April 1955 for a training cruise, making several port visits. In May 1956, the First Canadian Minesweeping Squadron deployed as part of the NATO minesweeping exercise Minex Sweep Clear One in the western Atlantic.

The ship remained in service with the Royal Canadian Navy until being paid off on 22 August 1957. The ship was transferred to the Turkish Navy as part of the NATO Mutual Aid Agreement on 31 March 1958. Commissioned into the Turkish Navy on 19 May 1958 and renamed Trabzon, the ship remained in service until 1991.

References

Notes

Citations

References
 
 
 
 
 
 

 

Bay-class minesweepers
Ships built in Quebec
1951 ships
Cold War minesweepers of Canada
Minesweepers of the Royal Canadian Navy